Lyngstadaas syndrome, also known as severe dental aberrations in familial steroid dehydrogenase deficiency, is a rare autosomal recessive liver disease involving an enzyme (steroid dehydrogenase) deficiency and dental anomalies. The disease is named after the Norwegian professor Ståle Petter Lyngstadaas.

Cause
Lyngstadaas syndrome is an autosomal recessive liver disease.

Diagnosis

Management

Epidemiology 
Office of Rare Diseases listed Lyngstadaas syndrome as a "rare disease". This means that Lyngstadaas syndrome, or a subtype of Lyngstadaas syndrome, affects less than 200,000 people in the US population. 

Orphanet, a consortium of European partners, currently defines a condition rare when if affects 1 person per 2,000. They list Lyngstadaas syndrome as a "rare disease".

See also 
 Rare disease

References

External links 

Rare syndromes
Syndromes affecting teeth
Rare genetic syndromes